Jackson Township is a township in Sharp County, Arkansas, United States. Its total population was 295 as of the 2010 United States Census, a decrease of 9.51 percent from 326 at the 2000 census.

According to the 2010 Census, Jackson Township is located at  (36.225564, -91.413279).

The town of Williford is located within the township.

References

External links 

Townships in Arkansas
Sharp County, Arkansas